Savage is the sixth studio album by British pop duo Eurythmics, released on 9 November 1987 by RCA Records.

The album peaked at number seven on the UK Albums Chart and has been certified Platinum by the British Phonographic Industry (BPI) for shipments in excess of 300,000 copies.

Background
Following the much more mainstream commercial content of their previous two albums, Savage saw Eurythmics "turn sharp left" (as band member Dave Stewart put it), returning to the much more experimental sound that their early albums incorporated. Produced in France (recorded at Chateau de Dangu in Normandy and mixed at Grande Armée Studios in Paris), the album made heavy use of the NED Synclavier digital sampling keyboard. The only other musician working on the recordings with Stewart and Annie Lennox was drummer Olle Romo, who handled much of the Synclavier programming. Lennox brought more of a feminist focus to her lyrics which was made more evident by the accompanying video album, which featured a video for each song.

Release and reception
Although the album was not as commercially successful as the duo's previous two albums, it reached the top 10 in the United Kingdom, spawned three UK top-30 singles, and has been certified Platinum. It was less successful in the United States, where it peaked at number 41.

On 14 November 2005, Sony BMG repackaged and released most of Eurythmics' back catalogue (including Savage) as deluxe edition reissues. Each of their eight studio albums' original track listings were supplemented with bonus tracks and remixes.

Track listing

Personnel
Credits adapted from the liner notes of Savage.

Eurythmics
 Annie Lennox
 David A. Stewart

Additional musician
 Olle Romo – programming

Technical
 Fred DeFaye – recording engineering; mixing engineering 
 Alan Moulder – lead vocal recording 
 Claude Pons – mixing engineering assistance 
 Manu Guiot – additional recording ; mixing engineering 
 Serge Pauchard – mixing engineering assistance 
 David A. Stewart – production

Artwork
 Alastair Thain – sleeve photography
 Laurence Stevens – sleeve design

Charts

Weekly charts

Year-end charts

Certifications

References

Bibliography

 

1987 albums
Albums produced by David A. Stewart
Avant-pop albums
Eurythmics albums
RCA Records albums